Stanisław Maroński (1825–1907) was a Polish educator and historian.

Publications (selection) 
  Die stammesverwandtschaftlichen und politischen Beziehungen Pommerns zu Polen, bis zum Ende der ersten polnischen Herrschaft in Pommerellen, im Jahre 1227. Neustadt i. W. 1866
 De auguribus Romanis commentationis pars prior. Neustadt/Wpr.()	
 Herodot's Gelonen keine preussisch-litauische Völkerschaft 	
 Jan Łaski, prymas, jako obrońca interesów narodowych w walce z polityką Zakonu krzyżackiego w Polsce 	
 Pieśń o narodzie cierpienia / Stanisław Maroński. - Gniezno, 1848.

1825 births
1907 deaths
People from Gniezno
People from Inowrocław
Polish educators
19th-century Polish historians
Polish male non-fiction writers